Marietta Giannakou (6 June 1951 – 27 February 2022) was a Greek politician, member of New Democracy. She served as Minister for National Education and Religious Affairs of Greece.

Biography
She was born in Geraki Lakonias and she became a doctor and neuro-psychologist at the Faculty of Medicine at the University of Athens. She has been a member of the Greek Parliament, vice-chairman of the Parliamentary Committee on European Affairs, a member of the Parliamentary Committee on Foreign Affairs and National Defence, and a member of the Interparty Parliamentary Committee on the examination of the drugs problem. Moreover, she was the chairman of the Greek Friendship Group between the Parliaments of Greece and Poland and member of the Greek Friendship Groups between the Parliaments of Greece and the United States and of Greece and Morocco. National Coordinator and Member of the Horizontal Working Party on Drugs of the Council of the European Union. Chairman of the Balkans/Middle East Regional Group of the Dublin Group of the Council of the European Union. Member of the Political Bureau of the European People's Party. She was a former Minister of Health, Welfare and Social Security, as well as a former member of the Greek Parliament. She was also a former member of the European Parliament, as well as the former head of the Delegation of the New Democracy Party in the European Parliament. She used to be the chairman of the European Committee “Fourth World”, as well as the former vice-president of the European Christian Democratic Union. In her lifetime, she has published numerous scientific articles and reports pertaining to European perspectives towards drug problems, organized crime, women in contemporary societies, as well as social policies.

Giannakou was appointed Minister for National Education and Religious Affairs on 10 March 2004. She tried to change the law so that private universities will be recognized because private universities are forbidden by the 1975 constitution. Her educational policy led to massive demonstrations by students and teachers.

Giannakou failed to win a seat in the September 2007 parliamentary election and lost her position in the Cabinet.

On 6 February 2008, due to an older injury on her right leg, she entered Errikos Dunan hospital of Athens. On 7 February, the doctors were unable to restore its former condition proceeded to an amputation below the knee. Further complications led to an above knee amputation. She had an uncomplicated recovery and she returned to the active politics.

In May 2009 she was chosen to lead the New Democracy EP list and she was subsequently elected as 1 of the 22 Greek MEPs. In November 2020 she was elected vice-president of the NATO Parliamentary Assembly.

Giannakou died in Athens on 27 February 2022, at the age of 70.

References

External links
 Biography on Greek Parliament website
 

1951 births
2022 deaths
20th-century Greek physicians
20th-century women physicians
21st-century women MEPs for Greece
Greek MPs 1993–1996
Greek MPs 1996–2000
Greek MPs 2000–2004
Greek MPs 2004–2007
Greek amputees
Women government ministers of Greece
Politicians with disabilities
New Democracy (Greece) MEPs
MEPs for Greece 2009–2014
Ministers of National Education and Religious Affairs of Greece
Greek physicians
National and Kapodistrian University of Athens alumni
Greek women physicians
People from Laconia
Greek MPs 2019–2023